Shaw House is a historic home and national historic district  located at Fairmont, Marion County, West Virginia.  The district includes two contributing buildings and two contributing structures. The main house was built in 1919, and is a -story dwelling in the Tudor Revival style. It features brick and stucco wall cladding punctuated
with simulated half-timbering, and tall chimney stacks.  Also on the property are a contributing garage, well house, and entrance pavilion.  The house was built for Harry Shaw (1872 - 1952), a noted attorney and jurist of the early 20th century in north-central West Virginia.

It was listed on the National Register of Historic Places in 1988.

References

Houses on the National Register of Historic Places in West Virginia
Historic districts in Marion County, West Virginia
Tudor Revival architecture in West Virginia
Houses completed in 1919
Houses in Marion County, West Virginia
National Register of Historic Places in Marion County, West Virginia
Historic districts on the National Register of Historic Places in West Virginia